Seticosta subariadnae is a species of moth of the family Tortricidae. It is found in Napo Province, Ecuador.

The wingspan is 28 mm. The forewings are brownish, the median area tinged ferruginous and the basal, subdorsal, and terminal area dark brown. There are distinct whitish lines. The hindwings are dirty white, suffused with brownish on the periphery and with brownish grey strigulation (fine streaks).

Etymology
The species name refers to the similarity with Seticosta ariadnae plus the Latin prefix sub (meaning near).

References

Moths described in 2009
Seticosta